Ojanen is a Finnish surname. Notable people with the surname include:

 Kaarle Ojanen (1918–2009), Finnish chess player
 Mirja Ojanen (born 1967), Finnish ski-orienteering competitor
 Janne Ojanen (born 1968), Finnish professional ice hockey player
 Juho Ojanen (born 2002), Finnish footballer

Finnish-language surnames